Prospect Heights School District 23 is a school district located in Prospect Heights, Illinois, a Chicago suburb. The majority of the schools, (Betsy Ross Elementary School, Anne Sullivan Elementary School, and Douglas A. MacArthur Middle School) are located in the corner of Palatine Rd. and Schoenbeck Rd. Dwight D. Eisenhower Elementary School is located near the Public Library and Park District center of the city at Camp McDonald Rd. and Schoenbeck Rd. Altogether, a total of about 1,450 student attend the school. A little less than half attend the middle school. Students from Prospect Heights, Arlington Heights, Mount Prospect and Wheeling attend the school district. The districts students later attend Township High School District 214 going to either John Hersey High School or Wheeling High School.

Schools
Betsy Ross Elementary School (2-3)
Anne Sullivan Elementary School (4-5)
Dwight D. Eisenhower Elementary School (PreK-1)
Douglas MacArthur Middle School (6-8)
Students from all elementary schools attend MacArthur and either Hersey or Wheeling.

References

External links

School districts established in 1912
School districts in Cook County, Illinois
1912 establishments in Illinois
Arlington Heights, Illinois
Mount Prospect, Illinois